Inter Moengotapoe (sometimes rendered Inter Moengo Tapoe or just IMT) is a Surinamese football club, based in Moengo, Marowijne between Paramaribo and the border town of Albina. They play their home matches at the Ronnie Brunswijkstadion.

Inter Moego currently compete in Eerste Divisie, and finished in 1st position in the 2018–19 season.

History
IMT was champion of Suriname 10 times, winning every year between 2006-07 and 2018–19 except for 2007–08, 2011–12 and 2017-18.

IMT has participated in the CFU Club Championship nine times, most recently in 2017 when they were eliminated in the first round, finishing runners-up in their group. The club kit manufacturer is Jako.

The club made international headlines in September 2021, when Surinamese Vice President, and club owner, then 60-year old, Ronnie Brunswijk, inserted himself into a 2021 CONCACAF League match against Honduran outfit, Olimpia, playing 54 minutes. Olimpia won the match 6–0. Following the match, video leaked online that showed Brunswijk paying Olimpia players after the match, suspecting pundits that Brunswijk engaged in match fixing. On 22 September 2021, CONCACAF launched a formal investigation, and on 25 September 2021 both Inter Moengotapoe and Olimpia were disqualified from the tournament, with Brunswijk being banned from playing in CONCACAF competitions for three years.

Honours

National
Hoofdklasse / Topklasse: 10
 2006–07, 2007–08, 2009–10, 2010–11, 2012–13, 2013–14, 2014–15, 2015–16, 2016–17, 2018–19

Surinamese Cup: 3
 2011–12, 2016–17, 2018–19

Suriname President's Cup: 6
 2007, 2010, 2011, 2012, 2013, 2017

Continental
Caribbean Club Shield: 
Runners-up: (1) 2018
Caribbean Club Championship: 
Runners-up: (1) 2021

Other
Guyana Cup: 2
 2010, 2014

Performance in CONCACAF competitions

2004 CFU Club Championship
Quarter-finals v.  Juventus – 2:0, 1:1
Semi-finals v.  Harbour View – 4:6, 2:3

2007 CFU Club Championship
Group stage v.  SAP – 3:3
Group stage v.  Harbour View – 2:1
Group stage v.  Puerto Rico Islanders – 2:5

2009 CFU Club Championship
First Round v.  CSD Barber – 0:1, 3:1
Second Round v.  San Juan Jabloteh – 1:3, 1:2

2011 CFU Club Championship
Preliminary Phase v.  Milerock – 1:0, 1:2

2012 CFU Club Championship
First Round v.  Alpha United – 1:0
First Round v.  Milerock – 7:1
First Round v.  Hubentut Fortuna – 3:2
Second Round v.  Antigua Barracuda – 0:3
Second Round v.  W Connection – 0:6
Second Round v.  Victory – 2:8

2014 CFU Club Championship
First Round v.  Waterhouse – 0:4
First Round v.  Caledonia AIA – 2:2
First Round v.  Mirebalais – 1:2

2015 CFU Club Championship
First Round v.  Alpha United – 0:3
First Round v.  Central – 0:2

2016 CFU Club Championship
First Round v.  CS Moulien – 3–2
First Round v.  Atlántico FC – 1–0
First Round v.  W Connection – 1–3

2017 CFU Club Championship
First Round v.  Racing des Gonaïves 2–2
First Round v.  Hoppers 2–0 
First Round v.  Bequia United 4–1

2018 Caribbean Club Shield
Group Stage v.  Nacional 5–0
Group Stage v.  Weymouth Wales 5–0 
Group Stage v.  USR 5–1
Semi Final v.  Nacional 4–0
Final v.  Club Franciscain 1–2

2021 Caribbean Club Championship
Group Stage v.  Flames United 12–0
Group Stage v.  O&M 1–1 
Semi Final v.  Metropolitan 3–1
Final v.  Cavaly 0–3

2021 CONCACAF League
Round of 16 v.  Olimpia 0–6, DSQ.

2022 Caribbean Club Shield
Group Stage v.  Nacional 5–2
Group Stage v.  Golden Lion 4–3
Semi Final v.  Gosier  4–0
Final v.  Bayamon  1–2

Players

Current squad

References

 
Football clubs in Moengo
Football clubs in Suriname
1992 establishments in Suriname
Association football clubs established in 1992